Linda Weiser Friedman (born 1953) is an author and academic.  She is a Professor of Statistics and Computer Information Systems at Baruch College and the CUNY Graduate Center. Friedman holds a PhD in Operations Research from New York University Polytechnic School of Engineering and a B.A degree in Statistics / Biology from Baruch College.  Her research and teaching interests are varied and include business statistics, object-oriented programming, humor studies, Jewish studies, online education, social media, and all things technology. Her most recent book is God Laughed: Sources of Jewish Humor, which Publishers Weekly called a "lighthearted but thoughtful study". She also writes fiction and poetry, and lives in the Borough Park neighborhood of Brooklyn.

Early life
Linda Weiser Friedman was born in New York City to Norman and Marion Weiser, and grew up in the Brooklyn neighborhoods of Crown Heights and Midwood.  She attended Crown Heights Yeshiva (when it was still located at 310 Crown St.) and Esther Schoenfeld High School (in the Lower East Side).  She married Hershey H. Friedman in 1972; they have five adult children.

Books
Hershey H. Friedman and Linda Weiser Friedman, God Laughed: Sources of Jewish Humor, Transaction Publishers, 2014. 
Linda Weiser Friedman, The Simulation Metamodel, Kluwer Academic, Norwell, Mass., 1996. 
Linda Weiser Friedman, Comparative Programming Languages: Generalizing the Programming Function. Englewood Cliffs, NJ: Prentice Hall, 1991. 
Deadly Stakes, coauthored with Hershey H. Friedman under the pseudonym H. Fred Wiser, Walker Publishing, 1989.

References

External links
Official website
 SSRN author page
Google Scholar page

Jewish American academics
Jewish scientists
Baruch College faculty
Graduate Center, CUNY faculty
City University of New York faculty
Polytechnic Institute of New York University alumni
Baruch College alumni
American Orthodox Jews
Living people
1953 births
People from Borough Park, Brooklyn
People from Crown Heights, Brooklyn
People from Midwood, Brooklyn
21st-century American Jews